Holme St Cuthbert (occasionally Holme St Cuthberts; pronounced and occasionally written Holme Saint Cuthbert) is a small village and civil parish in the borough of Allerdale, in the county of Cumbria, United Kingdom. The village is located approximately 23 miles to the south-west of Carlisle, Cumbria's county town, and was historically in the county of Cumberland.

Civil parish
The civil parish of Holme St Cuthbert is a rural area, and includes the village of Mawbray and the hamlets of Aikshaw, Beckfoot, Cowgate, Dubmill, Edderside, Goodyhills, Hailforth, Jericho, New Cowper, Newtown, Pelutho, Plasketlands, Salta, and Tarns. It is bordered to the north by the civil parish of Holme Low, to the east by Holme Abbey, to the south by Allonby along the Black Dub beck, and to the south-east by Westnewton. On its western side, the parish meets the Solway Firth, and has approximately four miles of coastline.

There were 421 residents in 160 households at the 2001 census, and at the 2011 census, that number had risen to 465 residents in 185 households, an increase of 10.5% in ten years. Despite the recent increase, however, the parish's population remains well below where it was in the 19th and early 20th centuries. In 1871-2, the population was given as 821, and steadily declined in the years to at least 1961, when it reached similar levels to those recorded in 2011.

Mawbray, being the largest village in the parish, is the hub of the community. Mawbray's village hall is frequently used for a wide range of activities, and the Lowther Arms in Mawbray has been a popular spot for food and drink with residents of the parish since it re-opened in 2014 after two periods of closure in the 2000s and early 2010s.

The parish (then known as a township) was said to be 6,301 hectares, with the land being owned by Holm Cultram Abbey. In 1814, common land was enclosed by an invocation of the Inclosure Acts. Before becoming a parish of its own in 1857, Holme St Cuthbert was listed as a quarter of the parish of Holme Cultram by at least 1801. The quarter was centred around Mawbray - then known as Old Malbray. Holme St Cuthbert was also known as St Cuthbert's township at that time.

During the Second World War, 43 evacuees from Newcastle-Upon-Tyne and the surrounding area were billeted to farms in the parish.

As a civil parish, Holme St Cuthbert has a parish council, which in 2018 consisted of seven members. Parish council meetings are generally held on the 3rd Wednesday of January, March, April, May, July, September and November. The Annual Parish Meeting is generally held on the 3rd Wednesday in May of each year, where the parish council report to the community. Since 2016, recorded minutes of parish council meetings have been available to all residents of the parish via their website.

Holme St Cuthbert parish council took a stand against plans by the British government to use west Cumbria as a disposal and storage site for nuclear waste. The process, called Managing Radioactive Waste Safely (MRWS) drew strong objections from the community at a meeting on the subject, and the council accordingly adopted a motion calling for west Cumbria to withdraw from the MRWS process. The main reasons for objecting were concerns about geology, damage to local tourism, and safety. Furthermore, the council stated that they had "no confidence" in their right to withdraw from the process as it progressed.

Extremes of weather are uncommon in the parish, but one serious danger is from the sea. With over four miles of coastline in the parish, and a major road (the B5300) sticking very close to the shore, storms and even very high tides are a threat. In 2014 the sea wall at Dubmill Point, near Salta, was breached in several places, and a £130,000 repair scheme was commissioned by Cumbria County Council.

Between November and December 2018 a public consultation called the Cumbria Coastal Strategy was held to evaluate and manage the risks related to coastal flooding and erosion along the Cumbrian coastline. Holme St Cuthbert civil parish has approximately four miles of coastline, and this was assessed as part of the consultation. The well-defended area of coastline around Dubmill was mostly determined to have between five and twenty years worth of life left, but concerns were raised about failed rock-based sea defences to the south and north of Dubmill point. The consultation also set out to determine the impact coastal erosion would have on the village of Mawbray, with the potential to change tactics if there was to be significant impact. The sand dunes at Mawbray Bank were estimated to erode anywhere from 4 to 8 metres in the next 20 years, rising to as much as 40 m of erosion in the next century if left unchecked. At Beckfoot, it was noted that much of the erosion that has taken place and is predicted to take place in the future is as a result of individual storms rather than continuous, slow erosion. Over the next century, the coast at Beckfoot is estimated to endure no more than 6.6 m of erosion.

Village

Holme St Cuthbert itself is particularly small.  While it is home to the parish church, church hall, and the local primary school, there are very few houses. There are two school buildings - the main building and a second, smaller one which serves as both the sports hall and canteen. Separating the two buildings is a car park, shared between the school and church.

St Cuthbert's Church was constructed of locally quarried sandstone, and remains in use today. The primary school, though it caters to less than 50 pupils, has been rated as "outstanding" by school inspectors Ofsted. The church and school were built in 1845. The opening of the church in that year meant that the village was no longer part of the parish of Holme Abbey, but instead was to become the namesake of a new parish.

The village lies along the road which runs from the B5300 coast road at Mawbray to the B5301 at Tarns. There is also a junction in the village, where a side road leads past the church hall to Goodyhills, less than a quarter of a mile away, and Jericho. There are no regular public transport links, though a school bus stops in the village bound for the Nelson Thomlinson school in Wigton. The nearest stop on a regular bus service is at Mawbray, where services run every two hours toward Maryport in the south and Silloth-on-Solway in the north. The nearest railway station is at Aspatria, five-and-a-half miles to the south-east, where trains on the Cumbrian Coast line run approximately once an hour north toward Carlisle and south toward Whitehaven, and occasionally Barrow-in-Furness and Lancaster.

Etymology
The name is derived from Old Norse, where the Norse word "holmr" meant "islet". Hence, "Holme St Cuthbert" means "St Cuthbert's islet". Saint Cuthbert, for whom the church is named, was an early Anglo-Saxon Saint who is most famous for his association with the Lindisfarne Gospels. It is unlikely he visited the parish, but he definitely visited Carlisle. He is celebrated across the north of England and southern Scotland.

See also

Listed buildings in Holme St Cuthbert

References

External links

Cumbria County History Trust: Holme St Cuthbert (nb: provisional research only – see Talk page)
 
http://www.axcis.co.uk/schools-directory/Holme-St-Cuthbert-Primary-School/28512

 
Villages in Cumbria
Civil parishes in Cumbria
Allerdale